Hollywood Lights is a 1932 American Pre-Code comedy film directed by Fatty Arbuckle, starring Rita Flynn, Virginia Brooks, Tut Mace, and Ted O'Shea.

Cast
 Rita Flynn
 Virginia Brooks
 Tut Mace
 Ted O'Shea
 Fern Emmett
 Lynton Brent
 Jack Shaw
 Bert Young
 Betty Grable (as Frances Dean)

See also
 Fatty Arbuckle filmography

External links

1932 films
Films directed by Roscoe Arbuckle
1932 comedy films
1932 short films
Educational Pictures short films
American black-and-white films
American comedy short films
Films with screenplays by Jack Townley
1930s English-language films
1930s American films